Kenneth MacKenna (born Leo Mielziner Jr.; August 19, 1899 – January 15, 1962) was an American actor and film director.

Family

MacKenna was born as Leo Mielziner Jr. in Canterbury, New Hampshire, to portrait artist Leo Mielziner (December 7, 1868 - August 11, 1935), the son of a prominent Reform rabbi (Moses Mielziner) and Ella Lane McKenna Friend (March 18, 1873 – February 2, 1968). 

Although Kenneth changed his name from Mielziner to MacKenna for stage purposes, it was taken from family roots. Ella's mother’s maiden name was Margaret A. McKenna, and Ella was also named McKenna. So it seemed natural for Leo, Jr., to take MacKenna as his stage surname, changing the spelling slightly. 

In Mary C. Henderson's book about his brother, Jo Mielziner, Mielziner: Master of Modern Stage Design (2001), she states, "Kenneth MacKenna was the classic example of the first born son. On reaching manhood, he felt that it was his duty to take care of his entire family: mother, father and sibling. Responsible, intelligent and clear-headed he was constantly setting up strategies for his family as if he knew instinctively what was best—and he was usually right." (p. 92). Kenneth's devotion to his wife, Mary Philips, and to his brother, Jo, as well as to Jo's adopted son, Michael Mielziner, continued until his death and then beyond. His own professional success as a story director with MGM allowed him to help support his brother's career, give generously to others, and contribute to the theatre, even after his own death. Mielziner was a five-time Tony Award winner.

Kenneth and his wife, Mary Philips, both actors, were also long-time supporters of the arts. As angels for the first production of South Pacific, Kenneth first brought the book to Richard Rodgers, suggesting its production as a stage musical. The Rodgers had been long-time friends with the MacKennas/Mielziners. Mary Martin, who starred in that production, created an embroidered signature scarf of all the stars in that first production of South Pacific and presented it as a gift of thanks to Kenneth and Mary. This scarf was later given as a gift to Lucille Hackett (née Bardorf), cousin and beloved "sister" to Mary Philips. Kenneth's role as an angel and his position as a director with MGM can be further researched through the Mielziner papers at the New York Public Library and through the library at MGM. Mary Philips had a successful career as a stage and film star during the golden age of the theatre. In September 1924, Humphrey Bogart had appeared in the Broadway play Nerves with Kenneth and  Mary Philips. They all became good and lifelong friends. Philips was later married to Bogart (1928–1938), but the marriage ended in divorce. Kenneth MacKenna married Mary Philips in 1938. It was the second and final marriage for both.

MacKenna was first married to actress Kay Francis on January 17, 1931. They divorced in February 1934. He married Mary Philips in August 1938 and they remained married until his death from cancer. As his wife, long-time friend, and companion, Philips described Kenneth as her true soulmate and felt as though her own life had come to an end when Kenneth died. MacKenna died on January 15, 1962, in Santa Monica, California, at age 62. He and Philips were buried at Forest Lawn Memorial Park in Glendale, California.

Biography

MacKenna was involved with bonds and stocks until he was discovered by William Brady and became a member of the cast of At 9:45. He debuted on Broadway in Opportunity (1920). While in New York, he also directed and produced plays for the Theater Guild. After sound films arrived, he signed a contract with Fox Film Corporation in 1929 and moved to California. 

Starting in 1931, he directed a few films in Hollywood, then resumed his Broadway theatre career in the mid-1930s. Soon Metro-Goldwyn-Mayer hired him as a story editor in New York. Later, back in Hollywood, he was made department head. He returned to acting in the late 1950s both on stage and in film.

One of MacKenna's last roles was portraying fictional Judge Kenneth Norris in the film Judgment at Nuremberg, which was released less than a month before MacKenna's death.

Broadway stage
1920: Opportunity as Jimmy Dow
1920: Immodest Violet as Arthur Bodkin
1922: The Nest as Max Hamelin
1922: The Endless Chain as Kenneth Reeves
1922: The World We Live In as Commander-in-Chief of Yellow Ants and as Felix
1923: The Mad Honeymoon as Wally Spencer
1923: The Crooked Square as Robert Colby
1923: Windows as Johnny March
1923: Dumb-bell as Ted Stone
1924: We Moderns as Richard
1924: Catskill Dutch as Peetcha
1924: Nerves as Jack Coates
1924: The Far Cry as Dick Clayton
1925: The Sapphire Ring as Dr. Erno Nemeth
1925: Oh, Mama as Georges La Garde
1926: The Masque of Venice as Jack Cazeneuve
1926: What Every Woman Knows as John Shand
1928: The Big Pond as Pierre Dimarande
1928: A Play without a Name as John Russell
1930: Man Trouble as Graham
1934: By Your Leave as David MacKenzie
1934: Wife Insurance as Gregory Landon
1934: Merrily We Roll Along as Richard Niles
1935: Othello as Iago
1935: Macbeth as Macduff
1936: Aged 26 as Charles Armitage Brown
1937: Penny Wise as Gordon
1959: The Highest Tree as Aaron Cornish

Produced & directed 
1936: Co-respondent Unknown

Film appearances (acting)
1925: Miss Bluebeard as Bob Hawley
1925: A Kiss in the Dark as Johnny King
1926: The American Venus as Horace Niles
1927: The Lunatic at Large as William Carroll / Henry Carroll
1929: Pleasure Crazed as Capt. Anthony Dean
1929: South Sea Rose as Dr. Tom Winston
1930: Sin Takes a Holiday as Gaylord Stanton
1930: Forever Yours (film left unfinished by Mary Pickford)
1930: Men Without Women as Chief Torpedoman Burke
1930: Crazy That Way as Jack Gardner
1930: The Three Sisters as Count d'Amati
1930: Temple Tower as Bulldog Drummond
1930: The Virtuous Sin as Lt. Victor Sablin
1930: Forever Yours
1931: The Man Who Came Back (1931) as Capt. Trevelyan
1931: The Spider (1931) as Cashier (uncredited)
1931: Good Sport (1931) as Rental Agent (uncredited)
1932: Those We Love as Freddie Williston
1933: Sensation Hunters as Jimmy Crosby
1960: High Time (1960) as President Byrne of Pinehurst
1961: Judgment at Nuremberg as Judge Kenneth Norris
1962: 13 West Street as Paul Logan (final film role)

Films (directing)
1931: Always Goodbye Fox Film Corp.
1931: The Spider Fox Film Corp.
1931: Good Sport Fox Film Corp.
1932: Careless Lady Fox Film Corp.
1933: Walls of Gold Fox Film Corp.
1934: Sleepers East Fox Film Corp.

References

 Mary C. Henderson, Mielziner: Master of Modern Stage Design (2001)

External links

   Mielziner Family Papers collection
 
 
photo gallery of Kenneth MacKenna NY Public Library, Billy Rose Collection

American male film actors
American male stage actors
Bisexual male actors
American LGBT actors
1899 births
1962 deaths
Burials at Forest Lawn Memorial Park (Glendale)
People from Canterbury, New Hampshire
Male actors from New Hampshire
Deaths from cancer in California
20th-century American male actors
Film directors from New Hampshire
20th-century American LGBT people